Milići  (Cyrillic: Милићи) is a village in the municipality of Banovići, Bosnia and Herzegovina.

Demographics 
According to the 2013 census, its population was 185.

References

Populated places in Banovići